Qarna (also Romanized as Qārnā; also known as Karna and Qārneh) is a Kurdish village in Beygom Qaleh Rural District, in the Central District of Naqadeh County, West Azerbaijan Province, Iran. At the 2006 census, its population was 813, in 128 families  . 

On 2 September 1979, Kurds of the village were reported to have been massacred by Shia Azerbaijani recruits in the Islamic Revolutionary Guard Corps. The Qarna massacre led to a shock among the Kurdish population. In an attempt to calm the situation, Ayatollah Khomeini announced the perpetrators of the massacre shall be brought to justice.

References 

Populated places in Naqadeh County
Kurdish settlements in West Azerbaijan Province